Filthy Lucre Live is a 1996 live album by the reformed Sex Pistols. The album was recorded live at London's Finsbury Park on 23 June 1996 during the band's Filthy Lucre Tour. BBC Radio 1 broadcast the concert live, featuring the complete show, including the final encore of "No Fun". "No Fun" was not included on the standard edition of the album. However, it was included in as an exclusive bonus track on Filthy Lucre Live's release in Japan, making the EMI-released Japanese edition the only release to include the complete show in its entirety.

Track listing 
All songs written by John Lydon, Steve Jones, Paul Cook and Glen Matlock, except as shown.
 "Bodies" (Lydon, Jones, Cook, John Beverley) – 3:34
 "Seventeen" – 2:31
 "New York" – 3:26
 "No Feelings" – 2:59
 "Did You No Wrong" (Steve Jones, Paul Cook, Glen Matlock, Wally Nightingale) – 3:41
 "God Save the Queen" – 3:23
 "Liar!" – 2:46
 "Satellite" – 4:07
 "(I'm Not Your) Steppin' Stone" (Tommy Boyce, Bobby Hart) – 2:53
 "Holidays in the Sun" (Lydon, Jones, Cook, Beverley) – 3:29
 "Submission" – 4:42
 "Pretty Vacant" – 3:33
 "EMI" – 4:16
 "Anarchy in the U.K." – 3:32
 "Problems" – 4:37
Japanese bonus tracks
"Buddies" – 3:32 (alternate audience recording of "Bodies")
"No Fun" – 7:12 (final song of the performance, broadcast live on BBC Radio 1)
"Problems" (Spedding Demo) – 3:36 (demo recorded by Chris Spedding in May 1976)

Charts

References 

Albums produced by Chris Thomas (record producer)
Sex Pistols live albums
1996 live albums
Virgin Records live albums